This page shows the results of the 2003 Centro Basket Championship for Women, which was held in the city of Leon, Mexico from July 2 to July 6, 2003.

Competing nations

Preliminary round

Group A

Group B

Semi Final Round

Loser finish 7th

1st/4th place

Final round

5th/6th place

3rd/4th place

Final

Final ranking

1. 

2. 

3. 

4. 

5. 

6. 

7.

References
FIBA Archives
Results

Centrobasket Women
2003–04 in North American basketball
2003 in women's basketball
2003 in Mexican sports
International women's basketball competitions hosted by Mexico
2003 in Central American sport
2003 in Caribbean sport
2003 in Mexican women's sports